Carli Elizabeth Cronk (born 2006) is an American deaf swimmer. In May 2022, she set the world Deaflympic record for having won the most number of gold medals by an athlete in a single edition of the Summer Deaflympics with a haul of 12 gold medals. She secured gold medals in women's 1500m freestyle, women's 200m butterfly, women's 200m freestyle, women's 200m and 400m individual medley, women's 200m backstroke, women's 400m freestyle, women's 4 x 200m free relay, women's and mixed 4 × 100m medley relay, women's and mixed 4 x 100m free relay events.

Biography 
She was born with deafness and she relies heavily on hearing aids and lip reading. She is currently studying at Churchill High School.

Career 
She took part at the 2019 World Deaf Swimming Championships and claimed a solitary silver and two bronze medals in the competition. In February 2022, she claimed bronze medal in the women's 200m freestyle at the University Interscholastic League Class 6A state championships.

She made her Deaflympic debut representing United States at the 2021 Summer Deaflympics at the tender age of 16 and was one of the cadres of the thirteen member swimming contingent to represent America at the 2021 Summer Deaflympics. She won record 12 gold medals in her maiden appearance at the Deaflympics eventually surpassing the American records held by Jeff Float and Laura Ann Barber for claiming the most number of gold medals at any Deaflympics. She also teamed up with fellow swimmers Matthew Klotz, Brooke Thompson and Collin Davis to secure gold in mixed free relay category.

During the 2021 Summer Deaflympics, she set three world records in deaf swimming for women. On 4 May 2022, she set the new world record in women's 1500m freestyle event by clocking 17:33.90 seconds. On 5 May 2022, she surpassed the world record in women's 200m butterfly event with a timing of 2:18.40 seconds. On 7 May 2022, she broke the world record in women's 400m individual medley event by clocking 4:58.53 seconds.

References 

Deaf swimmers
Living people
1965 births
American female backstroke swimmers
American female freestyle swimmers
American female medley swimmers
American deaf people
Deaflympic gold medalists for the United States
Medalists at the 2021 Summer Deaflympics
Swimmers at the 2021 Summer Deaflympics
Deaflympic swimmers of the United States
21st-century American women